Trichaster is a genus of echinoderms belonging to the family Euryalidae.

Species:
 Trichaster acanthifer Döderlein, 1927 
 Trichaster flagellifer von Martens, 1866 
† Trichaster ornatus (Rasmussen, 1950)  
 Trichaster palmiferus (Lamarck, 1816)

References

Phrynophiurida
Ophiuroidea genera